The Dr. Chandler Holmes Smith House  is a historic house in Madison, Florida, United States. It is located at 302 North Range Street. On March 26, 1998, it was added to the U.S. National Register of Historic Places.

References

Gallery

Houses on the National Register of Historic Places in Florida
Houses in Madison County, Florida
National Register of Historic Places in Madison County, Florida